Kaminia ("kilns") may refer to several places in Greece:

Kaminia, Hydra, a port near Hydra
Kaminia, Laconia, a village in Laconia
Kaminia, Lemnos, a village in the island of Lemnos
Kaminia, Achaea, a village in Achaea
Kaminia, a city quarter of Piraeus